The Sikorsky XV-2, also known by the Sikorsky Aircraft model number S-57, was a planned experimental stoppable rotor aircraft, designated as a convertiplane, developed for a joint research program between the United States Air Force and the United States Army. The program was cancelled before construction of the prototype began.

Design and development
The XV-2 was developed as part of a joint U.S. Air Force and U.S. Army program intended to explore technologies to develop an aircraft that could take off and land like a helicopter but fly at faster airspeeds, similar to a conventional airplane. The XV-2's stoppable-rotor design was intended to allow it to hover and fly at low speed like a conventional helicopter. It utilized a single-rotor design; a counterweight provided stability to the rotor system, while a tip-jet arrangement powered the rotor, which retracted into the upper fuselage when stopped, the XV-2 then flying like a conventional aircraft on delta wings. A single jet engine was provided for forward flight.

The XV-2 prototype was assigned the serial number 53-4403, but the project was cancelled before construction could begin.

See also

References
Citations

Bibliography

External links

 Helis.com: Sikorsky History part 2

Cancelled military aircraft projects of the United States
Gyrodynes
V-002
Stoppable rotor helicopters
Single-engined jet aircraft
Tipjet-powered helicopters
High-wing aircraft